Ophiomyxidae is a family of echinoderms belonging to the order Ophiacanthida.

Genera

Genera:
 Astrogymnotes
 Neoplax Bell, 1884
 Ophiarachna Müller & Troschel, 1842

References

Ophiacanthida
Echinoderm families